Zelfa Barrett (born 9 July 1993) is an English professional boxer who has held the Commonwealth super-featherweight title since 2019 and previously the European super-featherweight title in 2022. He also challenged for the IBF super featherweight title in 2022.

Professional career 

Barrett made his professional debut on 25 October 2014 at the Middleton Arena in Middleton, Greater Manchester, scoring a four round points decision victory over Kristian Laight.

After winning his first 18 fights, 11 by stoppage, he fought Chris Conwell for the vacant English super-featherweight title at the First Direct Arena, Leeds. Barrett won the fight with a fourth-round technical knockout (TKO) to capture the English title. Barrett dropped Conwell twice in round four, with the end coming at 2:20 after Conwell was unable to beat the referee's count of 10 following a left hook to the body.

His next fight came against Ronnie Clark for the vacant IBF European super-featherweight title on 24 February 2018 at the York Hall, London. Barrett lost the fight by majority decision over 12 rounds. Following a tentative opening round, the fight livened up in round two with Barrett electing to fight at range and having success to the body, while Clark came forward to work on the inside. The next few rounds saw much of the same; Barrett throwing punches from range and Clark forcing the pace to work at close quarters. After being warned for a low blow, Barrett was dropped to the canvas 1 minute into the sixth-round by a straight left-right uppercut combination from southpaw Clark. Barrett was on the back foot for the next minute, evading and blocking punches with the occasional hook and uppercut landing. Barrett began firing back with success in the closing minute of the round. In the second half of the fight, Clark began to show signs of fatigue which allowed Barrett to land his combinations at range with more frequency, with Clark still continuing to press the action and land single shots to make the rounds evenly contested. Two judges scored the bout 116–111 in favour of Clark while the third scored it a draw at 114–114.

Following two consecutive wins over journeyman Edwin Tellez, he then fought Lyon Woodstock on 15 June 2019 for the vacant Commonwealth super-featherweight title at the First Direct Arena, winning via unanimous decision. Two judges scored the bout 117–111 while the third scored it 118–110.

The first defence of his title came on 12 October 2019 against Jordan McCorry at the First Direct Arena. In a fight that saw McCorry lose a point for hitting after the bell at the end of the eighth, he was dropped three times; firstly in the third-round resulting from a left hook to the body; again in the eighth from a right hand to the body; and finally in the ninth-round from an uppercut, causing referee Steve Gray to wave the fight off at 1:43 into the round to see Barrett retain his title with a ninth-round TKO.

Barrett was booked to face the unbeaten Eric Donovan for the vacant IBF Inter-Continental junior-lightweight title on 14 August 2020, at the Matchroom Fight Camp in Brentwood, England. He won the fight by an eight-round technical knockout. Barrett made his first title defense against the former two-weight IBF champion Kiko Martínez on 13 February 2021. He won the fight by unanimous decision with scores of 118–111, 118–111 and 116–113.

Barrett faced the veteran Viorel Simion on 14 August 2021. Simion retired from the fight at the end of the fourth round. Barrett next faced Bruno Tarimo in an IBF super featherweight title eliminator on 18 December 2021. He won the fight by unanimous decision, with scores of 117–110, 117–110 and 116–111.

Personal life
Barrett comes from a fighting family, being a cousin of Commonwealth light-heavyweight champion Lyndon Arthur, and nephew to former British and European champion and world title challenger, Pat Barrett, who is also his trainer. He is also a cousin of Manchester United left-back Brandon Williams.

On Christmas day in 2011, Barrett's older cousin, John, was attacked at a private party held at Sinclair's Bar in Rochdale, Greater Manchester. He died the following day from a single stab wound to the back.

Professional boxing record

References 

Living people
1993 births
Boxers from Manchester
English male boxers
Super-featherweight boxers
Commonwealth Boxing Council champions
European Boxing Union champions